Wong Wai Jun (born 9 June 1997) is a Malaysian male badminton player. He was the runner-up of the Swiss International tournament men's doubles event.

Wong later partnered with Tan Jinn Hwa and competed in men's doubles at the 2017 Thailand Open Grand Prix Gold. They later competed in the Smiling Fish International. He also competed in the 2017 Tata Open India International Challenge partnered with Muhammad Idham Zainal Abidin Syazmil.

Achievements

BWF International Challenge/Series 
Men's doubles

  BWF International Challenge tournament
  BWF International Series tournament
  BWF Future Series tournament

References

External links 

Living people
1997 births
Malaysian male badminton players
Malaysian sportspeople of Chinese descent
21st-century Malaysian people